Mikael or Michael Pedersen may refer to:

Mikael Pedersen (1855–1929), Danish inventor of Pedersen bicycle
Michael Pedersen (politician) (born 1954), American state representative from New Hampshire
Michael Pedersen (cricketer) (born 1986), Danish left-handed batsman

See also
Michael Pedersen Friis (1857–1944), Danish prime minister in 1920
Michael Peterson (disambiguation)
Mike Petersen (disambiguation)